John Neil Munro, Scottish journalist and biographer.

Background
John Neil Munro was born in Campbeltown, Argyll and Bute, and grew up in Stornoway, Isle of Lewis.
He studied Modern and Economic History at the University of Glasgow and then postgraduate journalism in Cardiff.

Writing
In the 1990s Munro worked as a journalist for various UK newspapers, including The Glasgow Herald.

Works
The Sensational Alex Harvey (Firefly Publishing, 2002), a biography of Glasgow rock star Alex Harvey
Some People Are Crazy - The John Martyn Story (Berlinn, 2007. ; 2011), biography of John Martyn with a foreword by Scots crime writer Ian Rankin
When George Came to Edinburgh (Berlinn, 2010), George Best's time at Hibernian F.C.
Lust for Life! Irvine Welsh and the Trainspotting Phenomenon (Polygon, 2013), Irvine Welsh and the impact of his first novel, Trainspotting

References

Scottish writers
People from Campbeltown
Living people
Alumni of the University of Glasgow
Year of birth missing (living people)